Benjamin Jenison McCoy (November 9, 1915 – November 9, 2011) was a second baseman in Major League Baseball who played for the Detroit Tigers (1938–1939) and Philadelphia Athletics (1940–1941). He was born in Jenison, Michigan.

Biography

Baseball career 
McCoy was 22 years old when he entered the majors in September 1938 with the Detroit Tigers, appearing in seven games while hitting a .200 batting average (3-for-15). In 1939, though he played just two months for Detroit after Charlie Gehringer was injured, McCoy hit .302 with 33 runs batted in and 38 runs scored in 55 games played. At the end of the season, he was dealt by the Tigers to the Philadelphia Athletics in exchange for Wally Moses.

McCoy was among 91 Detroit minor league players declared free agents by baseball commissioner Kenesaw Mountain Landis. The Tigers had been blocking players in their minor league system for years, players with major league skills, which was a fairly common practice in those days as there were only 16 big league clubs and precious few jobs. For a middle infielder, McCoy was a very good offensive player, but Detroit had Gehringer and he was blocked in the minors.

McCoy played in 1940 and 1941 with the Athletics. His most productive season came in 1941, when he hit .271 with 61 RBI and posted career-highs in games (141), hits (140), walks (95), runs (86), home runs (8), and triples (7). He spent the next four years in the US Navy during World War II. When he returned from service, his skills had eroded and he never played another game.

In a four-season career, McCoy was a .269 hitter (327-for-1214) with 16 home runs and 156 RBI in 337 games, including 182 runs, 327 hits, 52 doubles, 18 triples, and eight stolen bases. A selective and patient hitter, he posted a solid .384 on-base percentage and a respectable 1.56 strikeout-to-walk ratio (190-to-122).

McCoy played in the  National Baseball Congress with the St Joseph's Autos team in 1946.

Before his death, he was recognized as one of the oldest living major league ballplayers.

Death 
McCoy died on his 96th birthday on November 9, 2011.

References

External links

Baseball Library
Baseball Page
Philadelphia Athletics Historical Society
Retrosheet
Time magazine

1915 births
2011 deaths
Detroit Tigers players
Philadelphia Athletics players
Major League Baseball second basemen
United States Navy personnel of World War II
Baseball players from Michigan
People from Grandville, Michigan
People from Jenison, Michigan